Carbon (legally Carbon, Inc.) is a digital manufacturing company founded in 2013 by Joseph and Philip DeSimone, Alex and Nikita Ermoshkin, Edward Samulski, and Steve Nelson. Carbon is based in Redwood City, California. The company manufactures and develops 3D printers utilizing the Continuous Liquid Interface Production process, with its first commercial product being the Carbon M1 printer. The company introduced its proprietary CLIP process on the TED stage in 2015. The Carbon Platform combines software, hardware, and molecular science in its manufacturing process to allow customers to build differentiated products efficiently. In April 2017, Adidas announced the first 3D printed midsole developed using Carbon technology.

History 
The company was founded in 2013 by Dr. Alex Ermoshkin based on ideas he originally developed with his son, Nikita Ermoshkin, to develop their own at-home 3D printer and further refined with input from Dr. Joseph DeSimone. In March 2015, Joseph gave a TED talk that showed a preview of a 3D printer prototype using Continuous Liquid Interface Production (CLIP). Carbon engaged in four fundraising ventures between 2014 and 2017 from investors such as Sequoia Capital, Google Venture, GE, Fidelity Management & Research, Adidas, BMW, and Johnson & Johnson.

Craig Carlson joined Carbon in 2014 from Tesla to lead the engineering team. In March 2016, Silicon Valley-based entrepreneur Josh Green joined as general counsel. In November 2018, Elisa de Martel was named chief financial officer. In December 2018, Dara Treseder joined as the company’s first chief marketing officer. In November 2019, Ellen Kullman was appointed President and CEO. Kullman served on Carbon's board prior to becoming President and CEO. Carbon’s board of directors includes former Ford CEO Alan Mulally, and Sequoia Capital partner Jim Goetz.

Awards 
The company has won awards such as:

 WEF Tech Pioneers

 MIT Technology Review's 50 Smartest Companies of 2017
 The Fast Company Innovation by Design Award

Partnerships 
The company has made partnerships with companies such as

 Ford in 2015
 Johnson & Johnson in 2016
 Adidas in 2017
 Vitamix in 2018
 Riddell
 Lamborghini in 2019

Products 
Carbon is a vertically integrated manufacturer that offers its own software, hardware, and materials products that leverage Digital Light Synthesis™, or DLS™, technology to produce isotropic end-use parts.

Hardware 
Carbon hardware uses the same basic principles of DLS™ to produce isotropic parts. All of Carbon’s hardware offerings are available as a subscription that includes service, support, and software upgrades. Different models have different build areas for building either more parts or larger parts. All the devices are connected to the cloud by default to allow for predictive maintenance, remote monitoring and control, and over-the-air software updates.

M1 Printer 
The Carbon M1 printer was Carbon’s first offering, which has since been replaced by the M2 as Carbon’s general-purpose printing device. It could produce parts sized up to 144 millimeters x 81 millimeters x 330 millimeters, with the light engine display LED using 75μm pixels. The printer supports using a variety of resin materials, including some already in production commercial applications.

M2 Series Printer 
The Carbon M2 printer can produce parts larger than the original M1 printer, up to 189mm x 118mm x 326mm, with the same 75μm resolution. The M2d is an entry-level device for dental labs with the same base hardware as the M2 except for a smaller build area for lower throughput. The M2d printer is upgradable to an M2 printer.

M3 Series Printer 
The Carbon M3 series printer was introduced in January 2022 as an update to the M2 Series printers.  The M3 is available in 2 configurations, M3 and M3 Max.  The M3 printers claim to bring a simpler, smarter, faster, and smoother printing experience.

Smart Part Washer 
The Smart Part Washer machine washes, serializes, and data-scans parts to automatically record production information.

L1 Printer 
The L1 printer offers 10 times the build area of the original M1 printer for high-volume production. It is offered as part of a complete manufacturing solution tailored to the application, such as the Adidas 4D midsoles or the Riddell SpeedFlex Precision Fit Diamond Edition.

Materials 
All Carbon materials are sold as a liquid resin. Each material is cured by UV light, which defines the overall geometry, and the engineering-grade resins have a secondary thermal cure, which sets the final material properties. Prototyping and modeling resins undergo only the UV cure and a post-processing IPA rinse.

See also
 Additive manufacturing
 List of 3D printer manufacturers

References

External links 
 

3D printer companies
Manufacturing companies based in the San Francisco Bay Area
Technology companies based in the San Francisco Bay Area
Companies based in Redwood City, California
American companies established in 2013
Computer companies established in 2013
Manufacturing companies established in 2013
2013 establishments in California
Privately held companies based in California